The 2018 season was the 11th season for the Indian Premier League franchise Kolkata Knight Riders. Dinesh Karthik was captaining the team for the eleventh season.

Squad 
 Players with international caps are listed in bold.

Season

League table

Results

League matches

Statistics

Most runs

 Source: Cricinfo

Most wickets

 Source: Cricinfo

References

External links

Kolkata Knight Riders seasons